Fearn may refer to:

Fearn, Highland, a small hamlet near Hill of Fearn
Fearn railway station, serving the two
RNAS Fearn (HMS Owl), a Royal Navy Fleet Air Arm base, active 1941–1957
Fearn (letter), the third letter of the Ogham alphabet, as named in Irish
Fearn Abbey, Ross-shire, Scotland
Hill of Fearn, a village in Easter Ross, Scotland

People
Amy Fearn (born 1977), English football referee
John Fearn (disambiguation)
Sir Robin Fearn (1934–2006), British diplomat
Ronnie Fearn, Baron Fearn (1931–2022), British politician
Sheila Fearn (born 1940), British actress
Thomas Fearn (1789–1863), American Confederate politician
Walker Fearn (1832–1899), American diplomat

See also
Fern (disambiguation)